Charlevoix–Côte-de-Beaupré is a provincial electoral district in the Capitale-Nationale region of Quebec, Canada, that elects members to the National Assembly of Quebec.  It consists of the entire territory of the following regional county municipalities: L'Île-d'Orléans, La Côte-de-Beaupré, Charlevoix, Charlevoix-Est. It notably includes the municipalities of La Malbaie, Boischatel, Baie-Saint-Paul, L'Ange-Gardien, Château-Richer, Beaupré, Saint-Ferréol-les-Neiges and Clermont.

It was created for the 2012 election by combining the entire former Charlevoix electoral district with most of the territory (though not most of the population) of the Montmorency electoral district, along with the part of the unorganized territory of Lac-Jacques-Cartier that Charlevoix did not already have, which was taken from Chauveau electoral district.

Members of the National Assembly

Election results

References

External links
Information
 Elections Quebec

Election results
 Election results (National Assembly)
 Election results (QuébecPolitique)

Maps
 2011 map (PDF)
2001–2011 changes to Charlevoix (Flash)
 Electoral map of Capitale-Nationale region
 Quebec electoral map, 2011

Baie-Saint-Paul
Quebec provincial electoral districts